Reading Football Club, established in 1871, is an association football club based in Reading.

Key 
 The list is currently updated to include all players who have joined the club since 1997. Those who joined before that date still need to be added.
 The list is sorted by the year the player joined the club. If more than one player joins in the same year then they are sorted alphabetically.

Player
 Players listed in italics spent their entire career with the club on loan.

Club years
 Counted as the years the player signed for, and left the club.

Appearances
 League and total appearances are both sourced to Soccerbase.

International career
 Players who made international appearances only have the highest level at which they played listed.
 A player's senior international team is sourced to National Football Teams whilst appearances at age group level are sourced to the Association of Football Statisticians. Players not covered by the above are sourced as needed in the "Refs" column.

Players with 25 to 99 appearances

Players with fewer than 25 appearances or 100 or more appearances

References 

Players
 
Reading
Association football player non-biographical articles